Higher-speed rail (HrSR), also known as high-performance rail, higher-performance rail, semi-high-speed rail or almost-high-speed rail, is the jargon used to describe inter-city passenger rail services that have top speeds of more than conventional rail but are not high enough to be called high-speed rail services. The term is also used by planners to identify the incremental rail improvements to increase train speeds and reduce travel time as alternatives to larger efforts to create or expand the high-speed rail networks.

The concept is usually viewed as stemming from efforts to upgrade a legacy railway line to high speed railway standards (speeds in excess of ), but usually falling short on the intended speeds. The faster speeds are achieved through various means including new rolling stock such as tilting trains, upgrades to tracks including shallower curves, electrification, in-cab signalling, and less frequent halts/stops.

Definitions by country
As with the definitions of high-speed rail, the definition varies by country. The term has been used by government agencies, government officials, transportation planners, academia, the rail industry, and the media, but sometimes with overlaps in the speed definitions. Some countries with an established definition of higher-speed rail include:

 In the United Kingdom, the term higher-speed rail is used for upgraded tracks with train speeds up to 
This is the equivalent of the definition of "Emerging High-Speed Rail" as defined by the Federal Railroad Administration. Below is the list of known definitions of higher-speed rail which use some of the 5 speed levels,  and :

Speed limits
In Canada, the assumption about grade crossing is that operating higher-speed rail services between  would require "improved levels of protection in acceptable areas".

In the United States, railroad tracks are largely used for freight with at-grade crossings. Passenger trains in many corridors run on shared tracks with freight trains. Most trains are limited to top speeds of  unless they are equipped with an automatic cab signal, automatic train stop, automatic train control or positive train control system approved by the Federal Railroad Administration (FRA). In developing higher-speed rail services, one of those safety systems must be used.

The FRA also regulates passenger train design and safety standards to ensure trains that operate at speeds of  up to  comply with its Tier I standard and trains that operate at speeds up to  comply with its Tier II standard.

Another limitation is the safety of grade crossings (also known as level crossings, flat level crossings, non-grade-separated crossings) which limits how fast trains can go. FRA regulations set speed limits for tracks with grade crossings as follows: Level crossings are generally the most dangerous part of the railway network with a large number of fatal incidents occurring at a grade crossing.
 For  or less: Grade crossings are permitted. States and railroads cooperate to determine the needed warning devices, including passive crossbucks, flashing lights, two quadrant gates (close only 'entering' lanes of road), long gate arms, median barriers, and various combinations. Lights and/or gates are activated by circuits wired to the track (track circuits).
 For : The FRA permits crossings only if an "impenetrable barrier" blocks highway traffic when a train approaches.
 Above : No crossings will be permitted.

In Europe, the limit is often  over grade crossings. In Sweden there is a special rule permitting  if there are barriers and automatic detection of road vehicles standing on the track. In Russia  is permitted over grade crossings. The United Kingdom has railway lines of 200 km/h (125 mph) which still use grade crossings.

With the above limitations, many regional transportation planners focus on rail improvements to have the top speeds up to  when proposing a new higher-speed rail service.

Similar categories
In countries where there had been rail improvement projects in the later part of the 20th century and into the 2000s, there are inter-city rail services with comparable speed ranges of higher-speed rail, but they are not specifically called "higher-speed rail". Below are some examples of such services that are still in operation.

Intercity trains that cross international borders are usually designated as Eurocity and reach similar speeds where tracks allow it.
However, the International Union of Railways recognizes the Mini-shinkansen lines as high-speed rail. Two Mini-shinkansen lines have been constructed: the Yamagata Shinkansen and Akita Shinkansen. Both of these lines branch off from the high-speed Tohoku Shinkansen line with top speeds of 320 km/h (200 mph).
 Spain: Many inter-city rail services operated by Renfe Operadora, the state-owned company, are not classified as high-speed rail. Those services are Alaris, Altaria, Arco and Talgo (from Talgo III to Talgo VII) with top speeds of 
 In Norway, there is sometimes talked about høy hastighet, which may be compared to higher-speed rail as used here – and høyhastighet, high-speed rail. Most of the rail network is old, with sharp curves, and speeds at only . The lines around Oslo are upgraded or renewed, or are planned to be so. By the same token, the Norwegian FLIRT trains and the El 18 locomotives have a top speed of 200 km/h. Gardermobanen is called a high-speed line, and the GMB Class 71 and NSB Class 73 are often called high-speed trains – with  top speed. However, the limits are blurry. Sometimes, e.g. the FLIRTs are called high-speed trains.
The operator brands it as high-speed rail services; however, the International Union of Railways only recognizes the  line from Stockholm to Malmö and Göteborg as the only high-speed rail line in Sweden which is still in the planning stage.
 In Germany regional trains along the Munich-Nuremberg high speed line which was built for  run at  without being specially designated. Those trains use locomotives that are used for Intercity trains elsewhere and the higher speed (in comparison to other regional trains) was chosen mainly to increase capacity.
The United Kingdom has service which run at 125 mph or 200 km/h, such as the ECML, WCML, GWML and MML
 South Korea: MOLIT designates railway lines as three categories: high-speed railway lines, semi-high-speed railway lines, or conventional railway lines. For conventional railway lines, due to the limitation of signal systems and designed maximum speed of trains, most lines are limited by maximum speed under .

Commuter rail services
Some commuter rail services that cover shorter distances may achieve similar speeds but they are not typically called as higher-speed rail. Some examples are:
 Coaster links Oceanside, California and San Diego on Pacific Surfliner trackage with top speeds of 
 Caltrain electrification project is underway between San Francisco to Tamien Station as part of upgrades for blended service with CHSR.

Rail improvement strategies

There are many types of train that can support higher-speed rail operation. Usually, the rail infrastructure needs to be upgraded prior to such operation. However, the requirements to the infrastructure (signalling systems, curve radii, etc.) greatly increase with higher speeds, so an upgrade to a higher-speed standard is often simpler and less expensive than building new high-speed lines. But an upgrade to existing track currently in use, with busy traffic in some segments, introduces challenges associated with the construction work that could potentially disrupt the train services. The followings are some strategies used by regional transportation planners and rail track owners for their rail improvement projects in order to start the higher-speed rail services.

Signal upgrades
Prior to the project, the system comprised a mixture of equipment from pre-WWI mechanical signalling to the remote control systems of the 1980s. In some cases, operators needed to telephone the local operators to manually control the signal boxes. With the new speeds, the signalling needed to be computerized. The project employed the Solid State Interlocking with the newly laid fiber-optic communication between the components to use three computer systems to control the signals. When the output of one computer differs from the other two, the system will fail that computer and continue the signal operations as long as the outputs from the other two computers are consistent. The project deployed the Train Protection & Warning System which allows the system to automatically applies the brakes at a sufficient distance to stop the train if the driver does not control the speeds adequately. The project also incorporated Train Control and Monitoring System to allow real-time monitoring of the position of trains.

They are both transponder-based and GPS-based PTC systems currently in use in the United States. By a mandate, a significant portion of the railroads in the United States will be covered by PTC by the end of 2015.

Track improvements
To support trains that run regularly at higher speeds, the rails need to be reliable. Most freight tracks have wooden ties which cause rails to become slightly misaligned over time due to wood rot, splitting and spike-pull (where the spike is gradually loosened from the tie). The concrete ties used to replace them are intended to make the track more stable, particularly with changes in temperature. Rail joints are also an issue, since most conventional rail lines use bolts and fishplates to join two sections of the rail together. This causes the joint to become slightly misaligned over time due to loosening bolts. To make for a smoother ride at higher speeds, the lengths of rail may be welded together to form continuous welded rail (CWR). However, the continuous welded rails are vulnerable to stress due to changes in temperature.

The tracks are with mixture of wooden and concrete ties. The rail weight varies but with majority being .

There may be restriction in maximum operating speeds due to track geometry of existing line, especially on curves. Straightening the route, where possible, will reduce the travel time by increasing the allowable speeds and by reducing the length of track. When straight routes are not possible, reducing the number of curves and lowering the degree of curvature would result in higher achievable speeds on those curves. An example is the elimination of three consecutive reverse curves in favor of one larger curve. Raising superelevation may be considered for sharp curves which significantly limit speed. The higher speeds on those modified curves, together with the higher superelevation, will require track modification to have transition spirals to and from those curves to be longer.

Old turnouts may need replacement to allow trains to run through the turnouts at higher speeds.

In order to minimize the downtime to upgrade tracks, a track renewal train (TRT) can automate much of the process, replacing rails, ties, and ballast at the rate of 2 miles per day. In the United States, a TRT is used by Union Pacific Railroad on the track shared with future higher-speed rail service in Illinois area.

For electrified track, the old catenary may need to be replaced. The fixed-tension catenary which is acceptable for low speeds may not be suitable for regular higher-speed rail services, where a constant tension is automatically maintained when temperature changes cause the length of the wire to expand or contract.

Crossing improvements
With trains running at higher speeds throughout the route, safety at all at-grade crossings needs to be considered.

In Australia, the levels of upgrade of the crossing in the rail improvements project were based on the risk analysis. The improvements included flashing light protection, automatic full barriers protection, and pedestrian gates crossings. The project also introduced the use of rubber panels at the crossings.

In the United States, the FRA limits train speeds to  without an "impenetrable barrier" at each crossing. Even with that top speed, the grade crossings must have adequate means to prevent collisions. Another option is grade separation, but it could be cost-prohibitive and the planners may opt for at-grade crossing improvements instead.

The safety improvements at crossings can be done using combination of techniques. This includes passive devices such as upgraded signage and pavement markings. Another low-cost passive device is median separators which are installed along the center line of roadways, extending approximately 70 to 100 feet from the crossing, to discourage drivers from running around the crossing gates. More active devices include the four-quadrant gate, which blocks both sides of each traffic lane. Longer gate arms can cover 3/4 of the roadway. Video cameras can also be installed to catch the violators. A signal monitoring system can also be installed to alert the crews when the crossing equipment has malfunctioned.

In Norway, grade crossing speed are not permitted to exceed .

Rerouting and passing sidings

In areas where there is frequent interference between freight and passenger trains due to congestion which causes the passenger trains to slow down, more extensive improvements may be needed. Certain segments of the line in congested areas may need to be rerouted. New track may need to be laid to avoid many curves which slow down the trains. In stretches of heavy freight train traffic, adding passing sidings along the segment should be considered. Sometimes certain stations may need to be bypassed.

Electrification

Another consideration is electrification. Electrifying a railway line entails a major upgrade to the rail infrastructure and equipment. On the infrastructure side, it requires catenary lines to be built above the tracks. New transmission lines are needed to carry power from the power plants. Substations are required for each of the  lengths to reduce severe voltage losses. There is also a need to consider the required amount of power supply and new power plants may be required. For locomotives, new electric locomotives are needed or existing diesel-electric locomotives can be retrofitted into all-electric locomotives, but it is a complicated task. These factors cause electrification to have high initial investment costs. The advantages of all-electric locomotives are that they provide quieter, cleaner and more reliable operations than the diesel-electric counterpart. The fuel consumption, locomotive maintenance costs and track wear of all all-electric locomotives are also lower. Furthermore, electric traction makes the operator more independent of oil price fluctuations and imports, as electricity can be generated from domestic resources or renewable energy. This was a major consideration in the electrification of the German Democratic Republic network, as lignite  (and therefore electricity) was cheap and plentiful domestically whereas oil had to be imported at world market prices.

An alternative to catenary lines is to use a third rail system which has a semi-continuous rigid conductor placed alongside or between the rails of a railway track. However the operating speeds of this type of systems cannot be greater than  due to its limitation of the power supply gaps at turnouts and grade crossings. Therefore, the third rail system is not generally used for higher-speed rail.

One example in the United States that does involve electrification is the Keystone Improvement Project to provide higher-speed rail service along the Harrisburg-Pittsburgh segment of the Keystone Corridor in Pennsylvania. The plan includes additional track, a new signal system and electrification. If completed as planned, this would allow Amtrak to utilize electric power continuously on service from Philadelphia to Pittsburgh.

In operation

Australia

In 1999, the concept of Regional Fast Rail project was initiated by the State Government of Victoria with a goal to provide express higher-speed rail services between 4 main regional centres of Victoria (Geelong, Ballarat, Bendigo and the Latrobe Valley) and Melbourne. The development phase of initiative was between 2000 and 2002. Finally, the services on four lines began between 2005 and 2006 with top speeds of 160 km/h using VLocity trains. Additionally, the services provided by Queensland Rail's Tilt Train, the Transwa Prospector and NSW Trainlink's XPT are considered higher-speed rail and all of those trains have a top service speed of 160 km/h (99–100 mph).

The New South Wales XPT (short for Express Passenger Train) is the main long-distance passenger train operated by NSW TrainLink on regional railway services in New South Wales, Australia from Sydney to Dubbo, Grafton, and Casino as well as interstate destinations, Brisbane and Melbourne. The XPT is based on the British Rail designed High Speed Train and entered service in April 1982. It came to fruition in January 1978 when the Public Transport Commission invited tenders for 25 high-speed railcars similar to the Prospector railcars delivered by Comeng to the Western Australian Government Railways in 1971. Comeng's proposal for a train based on the InterCity 125 was announced as the successful bidder in October 1976.

The Tilt Train is the name for two similar tilting train services, one electric and the other diesel, operated by Queensland Rail on the North Coast line from Brisbane to Rockhampton and Cairns.

The Transwa WDA/WDB/WDC class are a class of railcars built by United Goninan, Broadmeadow for Transwa in 2004–05 to replace the WAGR WCA/WCE class railcars on the AvonLink and Prospector services in Australia. They are capable of high-speed operation.

China

In China, higher-speed railways are railways that are not officially categorized as high-speed rail but allow CRH EMUs run on it with speeds up to 200 km/h. Typically these lines are classified as Grade I conventional railways and are used by both passenger and freight services.

Note that the majority of high-speed lines are also called "passenger-only"() lines. Inside mainland China this word invokes a sense of higher-speed rail but the wording usage is inconsistent.

Train identifiers
Identifiers starting with G indicates at least part of the train's route operates at a maximum 300 km/h or above (this is a characteristic of the line rather than the precise maximum speed of this exact train) and not running at deliberately reduced speed on any section. Other sections of the route may have lower speeds as low as 160 km/h.

Identifiers starting with C indicates short-distance travel using CRH trains, the maximum speed is irrelevant (ranging from 160 km/h Ürümqi-Korla service to 350 km/h Beijing-Tianjin (via intercity) service).

Identifiers starting with D indicates CRH services with maximum speed 265 km/h or less, including overnight sleepers on 310 km/h Beijing-Guangzhou line (running them 310 km/h overnight not only causes noises but also disturbs sleeping patterns of passengers. This is an example of deliberately reduced speeds).

Identifiers starting with S indicates metropolitan services using CRH rolling stock and have a different fare system to the national one. Their maximum speed is 160 km/h.

Note: The start and end station in the following lists accounts only CRH services.
* denotes some section of this line doesn't have 160 km/h CRH services.

Conventional lines running CRH services

Newly built lines operating less than 200 km/h speed

Designated 200 km/h, operating 160 km/h lines with currently no C/D/G class services

Slow speeds on lines normally running high-speed
This section lists the deliberately reduced scenarios mentioned in "train identifiers" section above.

Greece
The P.A.Th.E. Plan (Patras-Athens-Thessaloniki-Evzonoi), as it is called aims at reduced journey times between Greece's main cities (Athens, Thessaloniki and Patra) as well as an improved rail connection between Greece and North Macedonia.

India

The Gatimaan Express was India's first semi-high speed train. In October 2014, the railways applied for safety certificate from Commission of Railway Safety to start the service. In June 2015, the train was officially announced. The train was launched on 5 April 2016 and completed its maiden journey between Nizamuddin and Agra Cantt within 100 minutes. But due to low occupancy, Indian Railways first extended this train from Agra to Gwalior on 19 February 2018 and then to Jhansi on 1 April 2018.

The Tejas Express was Introduced by Indian Railways in 2017. It features modern onboard facilities with doors which are operated automatically. Tejas means "sharp", "lustre" and "brilliance" in many Indian languages. The inaugural run of Tejas Express was on 24 May 2017 from Mumbai Chhatrapati Shivaji Maharaj Terminus to Karmali, Goa. It covered 552 km in 8 hours and 30 minutes. On 1 March 2019, second Tejas Express of the country was flagged off between Chennai Egmore and Madurai Junction by Prime Minister Narendra Modi. It covered 497 km in 6 hours and 30 minutes. Lucknow – New Delhi Tejas Express, which was inaugurated on 4 October 2019, is India's first train operated by private operators, IRCTC, a subsidiary of Indian Railways. The Ahmedabad – Mumbai Tejas express, also operated by IRCTC was inaugurated on the 17 January 2020. From 1 September 2021, the train LHB Rajdhani Rakes are replaced with LHB Tejas Sleeper Rakes. This increased the speed of the train to 130 km/h. The train can travel at a top speed of 160 km/h making it a Semi-High Speed Train.

In 2019, Vande Bharat Express, also known as Train 18, was inaugurated. This is an Indian higher-speed rail intercity electric multiple unit. It was designed and built by Integral Coach Factory (ICF) at Perambur, Chennai under the Indian government's Make in India initiative over a span of 18 months. At the original price, it is estimated to be 40% cheaper than a similar train imported from Europe. The train was launched on 15 February 2019, from Delhi to Varanasi. The service was named 'Vande Bharat Express' on 27 January 2019. On 5 October 2019, a second Vande Bharat Express was opened from Delhi to Katra On 30 September 2022, Prime Minister Narendra Modi inaugurated a 3rd Vande Bharat Express rake connecting Mumbai and Ahmedabad passing through Surat. This rake was an upgraded second generation version. an other second generation rake was inaugurated from Delhi to Una passing through Chandigarh.

In 2021, Indian Railways started to upgrade Rajdhani Coaches to Tejas coaches. This replaced its traditional LHB Rajdhani coaches On 15 February 2021,The  Agartala Rajdhani Express was upgraded with Tejas livery Sleeper Coaches. On 19 July 2021, the Mumbai Rajdhani Express was upgraded to Tejas class smart coaches. LHB Rajdhani coaches. On 1 September 2021 the Rajendra Nagar Patna Rajdhani Express was upgraded to Tejas rakes. This increased the speed of the train to 130 km/h. The train can travel at a top speed of 160 km/h.

Inaugural run and entry into service 
The train flagged off for an inaugural run by Prime Minister of India Narendra Modi, on 15 February 2019, with its commercial run started from 17 February 2019 onwards.
It will be running on the Delhi-Varanasi route, via Kanpur and Prayagraj, connecting the holy city of Varanasi to the Capital city, reducing travel time along the route by 15 percent. The train's regenerative brakes are also expected to allow a 30% savings in electricity costs as compared to its predecessor. Although the trainset has been tested for speeds up to 180 km/h, it is capable of running at speed of 200 km/h. Every other car on the train is motorised. The 8-hour journey from New Delhi to Varanasi station has the Chair Car CC Class fare of ₹1,755.00 and covers the total distance of about 762 kilometers.

Laos

Passenger trains on the 2021 opened Boten–Vientiane railway travel at speeds of up to 160 km/h, however the railway has been described as 'high-speed' as well. Some sections of the railway were planned to allow speeds of up to 200 km/h, however this was downgraded to 160 km/h in the final design.

United States

This is the list of the current higher-speed rail services from the East Coast to the West Coast:

Earlier attempts

Canada
There have been several different attempts at higher speed rail in the Quebec City–Windsor Corridor, and several high speed rail attempts as well.

Ireland
In 2010, there was a report commissioned by the Chartered Institute of Logistics and Transport as a mid-term review of Transport 21, an Irish infrastructure plan announced in 2005. The report recommended, among other things, a development of national rail to provide higher-speed rail services. However, there have been no progress toward the recommendation.

United States
There have been long-range visions to establish high/higher-speed rail networks in different regions of the United States but without adequate funding. During the American Recovery and Reinvestment Act of 2009, there was a surge of interest to apply for grants from the federal government to start those projects. However, many proposals have been put on hold or cancelled after failing to secure funding or support from the public or key local politicians.

Amtrak Cascades

Amtrak Cascades, a  intercity rail service, stretches from Eugene, Oregon, through the State of Washington to Vancouver, British Columbia, in Canada. As of 2010, the long-term goal of this corridor was to have the top speeds of the segment of Eugene, Oregon, to Blaine, Washington, with top speeds in the  range, and eventually  on a dedicated track. This essentially halts the plan to provide a higher-speed rail service on this corridor in the near future.

Minnesota

Other higher-speed rail proposals are periodically considered, but would need to pass through neighboring states, which have thus far not agreed to cooperate. There is no current progress with the River Route project due to the cancellation of the funding in Wisconsin.

Another alternative that has been discussed is to have a new route that heads south to Iowa to join the rail link from Iowa to Chicago. There was a report in 2011 that Iowa would halt its involvement in high/higher-speed rail projects. Therefore, the status of the proposal to link Minneapolis–Saint Paul with Chicago via Iowa is unknown.

New York

The reconstructed trains, coupled with track improvements, would cut the travel time between New York City and Albany by 20 minutes. However, the project ran into many problems including issues with the trains and the unsuccessful implementation of required track improvements. New York ended the rehabilitation program in 2005 after spending $70.3 million. Fallout over the program led to litigation between New York and Amtrak; Amtrak would eventually pay New York $20 million and commit to funding $10 million in track improvements. New York auctioned off its surplus Turboliners in 2012 for $420,000.

Ohio

The Ohio Hub, a rail improvement project proposed by the Ohio Department of Transportation, is aimed at revitalizing passenger rail service in the Ohio region. The project is currently in an unknown state after the U.S. government rescinded the federal funding from Ohio and redirected it to other states.

Wisconsin
In October 2009, the Wisconsin Department of Transportation adopted the Connections 2030 plan which is the long-range plan for state transportation needs. The plan includes Wisconsin Rail Plan 2030, the twenty-year plan to improve the state railroad system by 2030. The latter phases of the project will expand the same service to Minneapolis–Saint Paul in Minnesota and another route to Green Bay, Wisconsin. There was a reaction against the project in 2010, and the $810 million grant the state originally received for the project from the federal government was rescinded. As of 2012, the rail plan is postponed indefinitely.

Current efforts

Baltic states
The three Baltic states have been working with the European Union as part of the Trans-European Transport Networks (TEN-T) initiative on a study to build a higher-speed rail line in the Rail Baltica corridor to connect Warsaw, in Poland, and Tallinn, in Estonia.

Bangladesh
Bangladesh Government has taken initiatives to develop high-speed rail (HSR) in between its two major cities – Dhaka, the National Capital City and Chattogram (former Chittagong), the second largest and the principal Port City of the country. Bangladesh Railway (BR), the Government-owned and-managed transportation agency of the country, signed a contract of BDT 102 crore on 31 May 2018 with a Consortium of China Railway Design Corporation (CRDC), a Chinese Company and Mazumder Enterprise (ME), a Bangladeshi Pvt. Ltd. Company for feasibility study and detailed design for construction of proposed Dhaka-Chattogram via Cumilla/Laksam HSR line.

With 320.79 km length, Dhaka-Chattogram is the main business corridor and life line of BR, and at present, the railway route is a circuitous way through Tongi-Bhairab Bazar-Brahmanbaria-Cumilla-Chattogram. The proposed shorter route, which would be Dhaka-Cumilla/Laksham-Chattogram, will cut short the length by about 91 km, making the total length around 230 km. The expected speed of the proposed HSR would be above 250 km/h (yet to determine) and it would take less than one hour to reach Chattogram from Dhaka, which currently takes more than five hours. Under the 18-month contract, the Consortium's responsibilities will include identifying alternative alignments, assessing the viability of the project, preparing detailed engineering design, and cost estimation.

Canada
Politicians in Windsor area proposed in 2012 that having higher-speed rail connection between Windsor and Detroit must be part of the consideration.

Greece
A project to modernize railway network in Greece is ongoing. A new  alignment between Tithorea and Domokos is designed to avoid the mountainous part.

India
In October 2013, the Minister of Railways announced at the two-day international technical conference on High Speed Rail Travel; Low Cost Solution that the focus of India's rail improvement is to implement a lower cost solution to meet the immediate needs by providing higher-speed rail services as an incremental step before the dedicated track high-speed rail can be achieved.

In 2019 the government approved 3 rapid regional railways including Delhi–Meerut Regional Rapid Transit System with speeds up to 160 km/h.

in June 2020 the government of Kerala approved the Thiruvananthapuram–Kasargode Semi High Speed Rail Corridor or Silver line, a Semi-High speed rail line connecting the state.

in July 2021, The Government announced plans of making 10 new Vande Bharat Express Lines connecting Over 40 cities. This is planned to be done by 2022.

Malaysia

The KTM ETS is an inter-city rail service operated by Keretapi Tanah Melayu Berhad utilizing electric multiple units. The KTM ETS is the second electric train service to be operated by the Malaysian railway company, after the KTM Komuter service.

The rail service is operated by KTM Intercity Division. It was previously operated by ETS Sendirian Berhad, a fully owned subsidiary of Keretapi Tanah Melayu Berhad. The operation speed for this train is 140 km/h.

New Zealand 
Advocacy group Greater Auckland proposed the Regional Rapid Rail initiative in 2017, including tilt trains with a maximum speed of 160 km/h. This network would link Auckland with Hamilton, Tauranga and Rotorua. In December 2018, the Government of New Zealand committed funding to reintroducing a five-year trial rail service between Papakura in southern Auckland to Hamilton, starting in 2020.

Panama
China claimed to invest capitals into 160 km/h rail corridor, total length would be 491 km.

Philippines
The state-owned Philippine National Railways plans to rebuild its historic South Main Line from Manila to the Bicol Region in the southeastern tip of Luzon. The agency will build  of track, with the main line itself leading to Matnog, Sorsogon and a spur line leading to Batangas City. The project will start construction in mid-2020 and is set to open partially by 2022.

In January 2022, PNR general manager Junn Magno defined the agency's future high-speed rail projects to be electrified railways with a maximum speed of at least . The high power costs and resulting expensive ticket prices resulted in the operation of high-speed rail in the country to be marked as infeasible. The agency then resorted to semi-high speed express trains for its new standard-gauge lines.

United States
This is a partial list of ongoing higher-speed rail projects from the East Coast to the West Coast.

Proposed routes
In addition to ongoing projects, there are proposed routes that have not reached the feasibility study stage yet. In Pennsylvania, a rail advocacy group started fund raising efforts in 2014 to obtain $25,000 for a preliminary study and additional $100,000 for feasibility study of the route from Erie to Pittsburgh. The proposal is for  express train services to directly link the two cities. An alternative is to have intermediate stops in Ohio cities including Ashtabula, Warren, and Youngstown before heading back to New Castle, Pennsylvania.

In Ohio, a rail advocacy group works with local political leaders in Ohio, Indiana and Illinois to consider a higher-speed rail line from Cincinnati to Chicago. This is in response to another advocacy group in Indiana that gained funding for the Columbus, Ohio – Fort Wayne – Chicago route that is already in feasibility study stage. The group persuaded the Hamilton County government in Ohio to advocate for the study. The county commissioners unanimously voted in September 2014 to pursue a feasibility study. As a possible route that goes through the states of Kentucky and Indiana, the county expects that Ohio-Kentucky-Indiana Regional Council of Governments will help fund a feasibility study.

In Michigan, a feasibility study sponsored by an environmental group is in progress for a new rail line between Detroit and Grand Rapids. The state transportation department is interested in the study but is not ready to move beyond this study.

In Texas, the East Texas Corridor Council proposed a higher-speed rail route between Longview and Dallas.

Vietnam
In 2018, Vietnam planned to build a higher-speed rail line in the northern part of the country to link between Haiphong, Hanoi, and Lào Cai which is then connected to China. The  line will run parallel to the existing regular speed railway.

See also

 High-speed rail in the United States

References